Jasper County is located in the U.S. state of Mississippi. At the 2020 census, the population was 16,367. In 1906, the state legislature established two county courts, one at the first county seat of Paulding in the eastern part of the county and also one at Bay Springs in the west, where the railroad had been constructed. Jasper County is part of the Laurel, MS Micropolitan Statistical Area.

Bay Springs growth passed that of Paulding. No roadway connected the two parts of the county until one was built in 1935–1936. The still largely rural county is the major producer in the state of gas and oil, located in the southeast, and of timber, cattle, and poultry.

History
Developed during the period of Indian Removal from the Southeast and increasing settlement by European Americans in the region, Jasper County was formed in 1833 from the middle section of what was previously a much larger Jones County. It was named for Sgt. William Jasper who distinguished himself in the defense of Fort Moultrie in 1776 during the American Revolutionary War. When a shell from a British warship shot away the flagstaff, he recovered the flag, raised it on a temporary staff, and held it under fire until a new staff was installed. Sgt. Jasper was killed in the Siege of Savannah in 1779.

During the antebellum years, cotton was cultivated with slave labor on large plantations in the county. This was the heyday of the county seat of Paulding, Mississippi, called the "Queen City of the East." It was a trading center for the plantations, as well as for yeomen farmers in the area. While some African Americans left the county in the early 20th century during the Great Migration out of the rural South to northern cities, in 2010 Jasper County had a population that was 52.6 percent African American, reflecting its history of cotton development and of people's ties to generations in this land.

In the late nineteenth century, when local people declined to invest in railroad construction at Paulding, developers shifted the route to the west, stimulating growth at Bay Springs, where a sawmill had been built in 1880. About 1900 that community was incorporated as a city. In 1906 the state legislature designated Bay Springs as the second county seat. It attracted major timber companies, such as Georgia Pacific, and other industries.

It was not until 1935–1936, during the Great Depression under a WPA project, that the first east–west road was built across the county, connecting the city of Bay Springs in the west with Rose Hill, north of the community of Paulding, in the east.

Medical facilities have been built at Bay Springs, with the Jasper General Hospital operating since 1962. Jasper General Patient Rehab was constructed on the hospital grounds in 2012 to supplement the offerings.

Recreation in the county includes a 9-hole golf course at the Bay Springs Country Club. Fishing and hunting are available, including around Lake Claude Bennett near Rose Hill.

In the 21st century, the county is still largely rural, leading the state in timber, cattle, and poultry production. It is the state's major producer of gas and oil, with resources concentrated near the community of Heidelberg.

Geography

Major highways
  Interstate 59
  U.S. Highway 11
  Mississippi Highway 15
  Mississippi Highway 18

Adjacent counties
 Newton County (north)
 Clarke County (east)
 Wayne County (southeast)
 Jones County (south)
 Smith County (west)

National protected area
 Bienville National Forest (part)

Demographics

2020 census

As of the 2020 United States census, there were 16,367 people, 6,629 households, and 4,746 families residing in the county.

2010 census
As of the 2010 United States Census, there were 17,062 people living in the county. 52.6% were Black or African American, 46.3% White, 0.1% Native American, 0.1% Asian, 0.4% of some other race and 0.6% of two or more races. 0.8% were Hispanic or Latino (of any race).

2000 census
As of the census of 2000, there were 18,149 people, 6,708 households, and 4,957 families living in the county.  The population density was 27 people per square mile (10/km2).  There were 7,671 housing units at an average density of 11 per square mile (4/km2).  The racial makeup of the county was 52.88% Black or African American, 46.47% White, 0.07% Native American, 0.07% Asian, 0.03% Pacific Islander, 0.08% from other races, and 0.41% from two or more races.  0.64% of the population were Hispanic or Latino of any race.

There were 6,708 households, out of which 35.00% had children under the age of 18 living with them, 50.90% were married couples living together, 18.20% had a female householder with no husband present, and 26.10% were non-families. 24.20% of all households were made up of individuals, and 11.30% had someone living alone who was 65 years of age or older.  The average household size was 2.68 and the average family size was 3.19.

In the county, the population was spread out, with 27.90% under the age of 18, 9.60% from 18 to 24, 26.70% from 25 to 44, 21.90% from 45 to 64, and 13.90% who were 65 years of age or older.  The median age was 35 years. For every 100 females, there were 91.00 males.  For every 100 females age 18 and over, there were 87.30 males.

The median income for a household in the county was $24,441, and the median income for a family was $29,951. Males had a median income of $27,183 versus $17,260 for females. The per capita income for the county was $12,889.  About 19.30% of families and 22.70% of the population were below the poverty line, including 28.90% of those under age 18 and 23.70% of those age 65 or over.

Public education
There are two school districts:
 East Jasper School District
 West Jasper School District

Communities

City
 Bay Springs (county seat)

Towns
 Heidelberg
 Louin
 Montrose

Unincorporated communities

 Garlandville
 Lake Como
 Moss
 Paulding
 Rose Hill
 Stafford Springs
 Stringer
 Vernon
 Vossburg

Ghost town
 Success

In popular culture
The Veteran's Story is a book written by Ada Christine Lightsey. The subject of the book is American Civil War veteran Ransom Lightsey and Company F (Jasper Grays), 16th Mississippi Infantry Regiment.

Politics

See also

 National Register of Historic Places listings in Jasper County, Mississippi

References

External links
 Jasper County Courthouse Pictures
 History of Jasper County
 Jasper County, MS Register of Motor Vehicles & Motorcycles [sic] (MUM00242) at the University of Mississippi, Archives and Special Collections.

 
Mississippi counties
Laurel micropolitan area
1833 establishments in Mississippi
Populated places established in 1833
Black Belt (U.S. region)
Majority-minority counties in Mississippi